Randy Powell is a writer who has penned several books in the young adult literature genre. He was born in Seattle, Washington in 1956. Powell had an interest in sports, and his Little League football team won the State Championship when he was 11. While at the University of Washington he became more focused on his writing, and penned several short stories and novels. He is married, and is the father of two children.

References

External links
Randy Powell’s personal website
Randy Powell at Farrar, Straus, and Giroux

American writers of young adult literature
Writers from Seattle
1956 births
Living people
University of Washington alumni
American male novelists
20th-century American novelists
21st-century American novelists
20th-century American male writers
21st-century American male writers
Novelists from Washington (state)